Vaughn Anthony Grissom (born January 5, 2001) is an American professional baseball short stop for the Atlanta Braves of Major League Baseball (MLB). He was selected by the Braves in the 11th round of the 2019 Major League Baseball draft. He made his MLB debut in 2022.

Amateur career
Grissom attended Paul J. Hagerty High School in Oviedo, Florida, where he and Riley Greene were teammates on the baseball team. As a senior in 2019, he batted .389 alongside pitching to a 0.82 ERA. He was selected by the Atlanta Braves in the 11th round of the 2019 Major League Baseball draft and signed, forgoing his commitment to play college baseball at Florida International University.

Professional career
Grissom made his professional debut with the Rookie-level Gulf Coast League Braves, batting .288 with three home runs and 23 RBIs over 44 games. He did not play a minor league game in 2020 due to the cancellation of the season. He began the 2021 season with the Augusta GreenJackets of the Low-A East, and was promoted to the Rome Braves of the High-A East in September. Over 87 games between the two teams, he slashed .319/.418/.464 with seven home runs, 43 RBIs, and 16 stolen bases. Grissom returned to Rome to begin the 2022 season. In mid-July, he was promoted to the Mississippi Braves of the Double-A Southern League. He recorded 91 at-bats in 22 games with Mississippi, hitting .363/.408/.516 prior to receiving a major league call-up.

On August 10, 2022, the Braves selected Grissom's contract and promoted him to the major leagues following an injury to Orlando Arcia. He made his MLB debut that night as Atlanta's starting second baseman at Fenway Park versus the Boston Red Sox, going 2-for-4 with a two-run home run over the Green Monster off of Darwinzon Hernández and a stolen base. At age 21 and seven months, Grissom became the youngest player in either the American League or National League history to homer and steal a base in his major league debut.

Following the departure of Dansby Swanson in free agency, Grissom entered the 2023 regular season with a opportunity to become the Braves' starting shortstop.

References

External links

2001 births
Living people
Baseball players from Orlando, Florida
Major League Baseball infielders
Atlanta Braves players
Gulf Coast Braves players
Augusta GreenJackets players
Rome Braves players
Mississippi Braves players
African-American baseball players